The 1973–74 season was Mansfield Town's 37th season in the Football League and 5th in the Fourth Division, they finished in 17th position with 43 points.

Final league table

Results

Football League Fourth Division

FA Cup

League Cup

Watney Cup

Squad statistics
 Squad list sourced from

References
General
 Mansfield Town 1973–74 at soccerbase.com (use drop down list to select relevant season)

Specific

Mansfield Town F.C. seasons
Mansfield Town